A  (Sanskrit) or  (Pāli) is one of a group of dwarfish, misshapen spirits among the lesser deities of Buddhist mythology.

 was a dialectal form for "gourd", so they may get their name from being thought to resemble gourds in some way, e.g. in having big stomachs.

The  are classed among the Cāturmahārājika deities, and are subject to the Great King Virūḍhaka, Guardian of the South. One of their chiefs is called Kumbhīra.

According to the Dà zhìdù lùn, greedy officers are reborn as kumbhāṇḍhas.

Buddhist deities
Buddhist legendary creatures
Lokapalas
Non-human races in Hindu mythology